Marco Vermey (born 11 June 1965) is a Dutch former professional racing cyclist. He rode in the 1994 Tour de France.

References

External links
 

1965 births
Living people
Dutch male cyclists
People from Lisse
Cyclists from South Holland
20th-century Dutch people
21st-century Dutch people